Emily Rose Epstein is an American drummer. She is best known for her collaborations with the garage rock musicians Ty Segall and Mikal Cronin. She was a former member of Segall's live band, and a former member of Cronin's. She met Segall at the University of San Francisco.

Before becoming a drummer, she was influenced to be a writer like her grandfather; Robert Epstein. Emily went to college to become a career writer. Her grandfather influenced her with art journalism and with poetry as well. Emily started playing the drums at a young age. When she was 13, she played drums for a UCLA band. While she was on tour with Segall, she would continue college and continued in journalism and editing.

She took a break from touring in 2015 to work at a record store as well as play in a country band called Emily Rose and the Rounders (formerly known as Blue Rose Rounder).

Discography
with Ty Segall Band
Slaughterhouse (2012)
Live in San Francisco (2014)

References

American indie rock musicians
American rock drummers
Living people
Musicians from the San Francisco Bay Area
Year of birth missing (living people)
Place of birth missing (living people)